St Cross, Oxford may refer to:

 St Cross Church, Oxford
 St Cross College, Oxford
 St Cross Road, Oxford